Antero Leitzinger (born 1962) is political historian and researcher for the Finnish Directorate of Immigration. He is the author of “Caucasus—An Unholy Alliance.” He is a history researcher on topics from Russia to Islam.

Leitzinger was born in Helsinki, Finland. The majority of his works are in Finnish.

Bibliography

In English
Caucasus and an Unholy Alliance, Leitzinger Books, 1997, 
Kurdistan, Directorate of Immigration, 1999,

References

External links 
The Circassian Genocide

20th-century Finnish historians
Finnish people of Swiss descent
Living people
1962 births
21st-century Finnish historians